These 113 species of swifts (family Apodidae) are recognized by the International Ornithological Committee (IOC). They are distributed among four tribes and 19 genera.

Tribe Cypseloidini
 Genus Cypseloides
 Spot-fronted swift (Cypseloides cherriei)
 White-chinned swift (Cypseloides cryptus)
 White-fronted swift (Cypseloides storeri)
 Sooty swift (Cypseloides fumigatus)
 Rothschild's swift (Cypseloides rothschildi)
 American black swift (Cypseloides niger)
 White-chested swift (Cypseloides lemosi)
 Great dusky swift (Cypseloides senex)
 Genus Streptoprocne
 Tepui swift (Streptoprocne phelpsi)
 Chestnut-collared swift (Streptoprocne rutila)
 White-collared swift (Streptoprocne zonaris)
 Biscutate swift (Streptoprocne biscutata)
 White-naped swift (Streptoprocne semicollaris)
Tribe Collocaliini - swiftlets
 Genus Hydrochous
 Giant swiftlet (Hydrochous gigas)
 Genus Collocalia
 Plume-toed swiftlet (Collocalia affinis)
 Grey-rumped swiftlet (Collocalia marginata)
 Ridgetop swiftlet (Collocalia isonota)
 Tenggara swiftlet (Collocalia sumbawae)
 Drab swiftlet (Collocalia neglecta)
 Glossy swiftlet (Collocalia esculenta)
 Satin swiftlet (Collocalia uropygialis)
 Bornean swiftlet (Collocalia dodgei)
 Cave swiftlet (Collocalia linchi)
 Christmas Island swiftlet (Collocalia natalis)
 Pygmy swiftlet (Collocalia troglodytes)
 Genus Aerodramus
 Seychelles swiftlet (Aerodramus elaphrus)
 Mascarene swiftlet (Aerodramus francicus)
 Indian swiftlet (Aerodramus unicolor)
 Philippine swiftlet (Aerodramus mearnsi)
 Halmahera swiftlet (Aerodramus infuscatus)
 Sulawesi swiftlet (Aerodramus sororum)
 Seram swiftlet (Aerodramus ceramensis)
 Mountain swiftlet (Aerodramus hirundinaceus)
 White-rumped swiftlet (Aerodramus spodiopygius)
 Australian swiftlet (Aerodramus terraereginae)
 Himalayan swiftlet (Aerodramus brevirostris)
 Volcano swiftlet (Aerodramus vulcanorum)
 Whitehead's swiftlet (Aerodramus whiteheadi)
 Bare-legged swiftlet (Aerodramus nuditarsus)
 Mayr's swiftlet (Aerodramus orientalis)
 Mossy-nest swiftlet (Aerodramus salangana)
 Uniform swiftlet (Aerodramus vanikorensis)
 Ameline swiftlet (Aerodramus amelis)
 Palau swiftlet (Aerodramus pelewensis)
 Mariana swiftlet (Aerodramus bartschi)
 Island swiftlet (Aerodramus inquietus)
 Tahiti swiftlet (Aerodramus leucophaeus)
 Atiu swiftlet (Aerodramus sawtelli)
 Marquesan swiftlet (Aerodramus ocistus)
 Black-nest swiftlet (Aerodramus maximus)
 Edible-nest swiftlet (Aerodramus fuciphagus)
 Germain's swiftlet (Aerodramus germani)
 Three-toed swiftlet (Aerodramus papuensis)
 Genus Schoutedenapus 
 Scarce swift (Schoutedenapus myoptilus)
Tribe Chaeturini - needletails
 Genus Mearnsia
 Philippine spine-tailed swift (Mearnsia picina)
 Papuan spine-tailed swift (Mearnsia novaeguineae)
 Genus Zoonavena 
 Madagascar spinetail (Zoonavena grandidieri)
 Sao Tome spinetail (Zoonavena thomensis)
 White-rumped spinetail (Zoonavena sylvatica)
 Genus Telacanthura 
 Mottled spinetail (Telacanthura ussheri)
 Black spinetail (Telacanthura melanopygia)
 Genus Rhaphidura 
 Silver-rumped spinetail (Rhaphidura leucopygialis)
 Sabine's spinetail (Rhaphidura sabini)
 Genus Neafrapus
 Cassin's spinetail (Neafrapus cassini)
 Böhm's spinetail (Neafrapus boehmi)
 Genus Hirundapus 
 White-throated needletail (Hirundapus caudacutus)
 Silver-backed needletail (Hirundapus cochinchinensis)
 Brown-backed needletail (Hirundapus giganteus)
 Purple needletail (Hirundapus celebensis)
 Genus Chaetura 
 Grey-rumped swift (Chaetura cinereiventris)
 Band-rumped swift (Chaetura spinicauda)
 Lesser Antillean swift (Chaetura martinica)
 Costa Rican swift (Chaetura fumosa)
 Pale-rumped swift (Chaetura egregia)
 Chimney swift (Chaetura pelagica)
 Vaux's swift (Chaetura vauxi)
 Chapman's swift (Chaetura chapmani)
 Ashy-tailed swift (Chaetura andrei)
 Sick's swift (Chaetura meridionalis)
 Short-tailed swift (Chaetura brachyura)
Tribe Apodini - typical swifts
 Genus Aeronautes 
 White-throated swift (Aeronautes saxatalis)
 White-tipped swift (Aeronautes montivagus)
 Andean swift (Aeronautes andecolus)
 Genus Tachornis 
 Antillean palm swift (Tachornis phoenicobia)
 Pygmy palm swift (Tachornis furcata)
 Fork-tailed palm swift (Tachornis squamata)
 Genus Panyptila 
 Great swallow-tailed swift (Panyptila sanctihieronymi)
 Lesser swallow-tailed swift (Panyptila cayennensis)
 Genus Cypsiurus 
 African palm swift (Cypsiurus parvus)
 Malagasy palm swift (Cypsiurus gracilis)
 Asian palm swift (Cypsiurus balasiensis)
 Genus Tachymarptis 
 Alpine swift (Tachymarptis melba)
 Mottled swift (Tachymarptis aequatorialis)
 Genus Apus 
 Cape Verde swift (Apus alexandri)
 Common swift (Apus apus)
 Plain swift (Apus unicolor)
 Nyanza swift (Apus niansae)
 Pallid swift (Apus pallidus)
 African black swift (Apus barbatus)
 Malagasy black swift (Apus balstoni)
 Fernando Po swift (Apus sladeniae)
 Forbes-Watson's swift (Apus berliozi)
 Bradfield's swift (Apus bradfieldi)
 Pacific swift (Apus pacificus)
 Salim Ali's swift (Apus salimalii)
 Blyth's swift (Apus leuconyx)
 Cook's swift (Apus cooki)
 Dark-rumped swift (Apus acuticauda)
 Little swift (Apus affinis)
 House swift (Apus nipalensis)
 Horus swift (Apus horus)
 White-rumped swift (Apus caffer)
 Bates's swift (Apus batesi)

References

Apodidae
Swift